The Cathedral of Our Lady of Guadalupe is a Catholic cathedral and parish church in Dodge City, Kansas, United States. It is the seat of the Diocese of Dodge City.

History

Early Masses in Dodge City were celebrated in the Union Church, which had been established by local businessmen and was used by various Christian denominations. Sacred Heart Parish was established in 1882 when a frame Gothic Revival structure was completed. Our Lady of Guadalupe Parish was established in the early 20th-century. Sacred Heart built another church in 1916 and Our Lady of Guadalupe built one in 1950. When Pope Pius XII established the Diocese of Dodge City on May 19, 1951 Sacred Heart Church became the diocese's first cathedral.  Between 1995 and 1998 the diocese went through a restructuring process and the Dodge City parishes needed larger church buildings. The diocese also had a need for a larger space for diocesan liturgies. During the episcopate of Bishop Ronald Gilmore the decision was made to merge both Sacred Heart and Our Lady of Guadalupe parishes. Robert Habiger of the Albuquerque architectural firm of Dekker/Perich/Sabatini was chosen to design the new cathedral, which was to be called Our Lady of Guadalupe. The cathedral was consecrated on December 9, 2001, and the parish was officially established the same day. The first parish Mass was celebrated by the Rev. Ted Skalsky on the feast of Our Lady of Guadalupe, December 12, 2001.

Architecture

The cathedral itself is an octagon shaped structure clad in Silverdale limestone that was mined near Arkansas City, Kansas. The building is accessed through a plaza that fronts the cathedral. In the center of the plaza is a fire pit used at the Easter Vigil. The worship space itself is accessed through a gathering space. Also off the gathering space is Sacred Heart Chapel, which is named for the former cathedral, and the shrine of Our Lady of Guadalupe. The image of the Virgin Mary in the shrine was given by the Rev. Jose Betancourt, who was the pastor of Christ the King Church in Silao, Mexico when Our Lady of Guadalupe Church in Dodge City was dedicated on April 19, 1950. It was created by Tobias Villaneuvo of Leon, Mexico.

The pews in the cathedral are made of white oak and provide seating for 1,430.  The altar and the ambo are both created from granite.  Soil from all the parish churches in the diocese was brought to the groundbreaking for the cathedral in 2000 and the altar was built over the soil.  The cathedra and the processional cross are both carved from Cuban mahogany.  The cathedra is also composed of a contrasting wood from Mexico named ziricote.  The tabernacle is made of polished bronze and Cuban mahogany.  Its design is based on Spanish and Moorish influences.  It sits on a granite pedestal that connects it to the granite altar.  Colorado artist Hubero Maestas created the stations of the cross and the main crucifix.  An ambulatory circles the perimeter of the worship space.  It includes six shrines for people's devotion.

See also
List of Catholic cathedrals in the United States
List of cathedrals in the United States

References

External links

Cathedral website
Diocese of Dodge City website

Christian organizations established in 2001
Roman Catholic churches completed in 2001
Our Lady of Guadalupe, Dodge City
Churches in the Roman Catholic Diocese of Dodge City
Churches in Dodge City, Kansas
2001 establishments in Kansas
21st-century Roman Catholic church buildings in the United States